Paule Malardot (1898 – ?) was a 20th-century French journalist and novelist, winner of the Prix des Deux Magots in 1947.

Paule Malardot was a journalist in prewar women's magazines then at the L'Aurore from 1946. She also carried out translations of stories and novels (especially from Italian).

She was married to journalist and writer Marcel Sauvage with whom she had a son.

Work (selection) 
1935: Les prédictions de Madame Frayat pour 1936
1947: , éditions SPLE, Prix des Deux Magots
1955: La Maison, vie domestique, éditions Clartés
1978: L'Orgueil des Kennelly, éditions Mondiales

External links 
 Palmarès du prix des Deux Magots
 Pour vous madame on CHERBOURGE/1938

20th-century French novelists
20th-century French journalists
French women journalists
Italian–French translators
Prix des Deux Magots winners
1898 births
Year of death missing
20th-century French women writers